Edmund Cooke may refer to:

 Edmund Cooke (pirate) (fl. 1673–1683), English pirate and buccaneer
 Edmund F. Cooke (1885–1967), U.S. Representative from New York
 Edmund Vance Cooke (1866–1932), poet
 Ted Cooke-Yarborough (Edmund Cooke-Yarborough, 1918–2013), early computer pioneer